LGBT representation in children's television programming is representation of LGBT topics, themes, and people in television programming meant for children. LGBT representation in children's programming was often uncommon to non-existent for much of television's history up to the 2010s, but has significantly increased since then. 

When Sailor Moon was released in the United States, elements of the story were removed because Optimum Productions, the Canadian company in charge of the English language product, claimed that some of the content “is not suitable for children.”

Early children's programming addressing LGBT-related subject matter in the United States includes two episodes of CBS Schoolbreak Special. "What If I'm Gay?" originally aired on March 31, 1987. The episode told the story of a teenage boy struggling to come to terms with his sexuality. It was nominated for three Daytime Emmy Awards, winning for Outstanding Direction in Children's Programming. The 1993 episode "Other Mothers" featured a boy who was afraid that his friends would think he was gay because he has two mothers. The episode was nominated for five Daytime Emmys, winning for Outstanding Writing in a Children's Special, Outstanding Performer in a Children's Special (Justin Whalin) and Outstanding Sound Mixing in a Children's Special. In 1986, HBO broadcast The Truth About Alex, which told the story of a high school athlete who discovers that his best friend Alex is gay.

LGBT representation on Nickelodeon
On June 18, 2002, children's cable network Nickelodeon ran a program entitled Nick News Special Edition: My Family Is Different. Produced by Linda Ellerbee's Lucky Duck Productions and hosted by Ellerbee, My Family Is Different featured children of gay and lesbian parents talking with children from households that oppose equal rights for gay and lesbian families. This program was subject to much criticism from Christian organizations, such as the Washington-based Traditional Values Coalition, who believed the program pushed a "pro-homosexual agenda" and was not suitable for children. Another organization that opposed this episode was the Parents Television Council who claimed they had no problem with same-sex parents but did not think it was appropriate for Nickelodeon's young target audience.

The confirmation of SpongeBob in SpongeBob SquarePants as asexual was not done directly in the show. In 2005, in response to criticism from Focus on the Family, a Christian fundamentalist organization, and the American Family Association, also a Christian fundamentalist organization, series creator Stephen Hillenburg described him as asexual, not gay. He repeated this in 2002 when Focus on the Family claimed that SpongeBob SquarePants was "homosexual propaganda," with Alan Sears, head of the Alliance Defense Fund, and James Dobson of Focus on the Family saying the same. In 2016, it was revealed that Hillenburg instructed those working on the show that SpongeBob should never have a romantic relationship, since he is asexual (as all real-life sea sponges are) and is too innocent for it.

Nickelodeon followed a similar path. On December 19, 2014, The Legend of Korra, another Nickelodeon show, aired their season finale, which showed Korra and Asami holding hands, showing they are in a relationship. As such, the show became one of the first western children's animation series to not only feature major LGBT characters, but also a lead LGBT character. In the aftermath of series finale, which aired on Nickelodeon and Nick.com, there were debates about "queer representation in children's media." Some noted that while the relationship between two bisexual characters, Korra and Asami, was built up during the course of the series, the words "I love you" were never uttered, nor did the characters kiss. Similarly, Kya of The Legend of Korra was shown to be lesbian in the graphic novel following the series finale. In July 2019, Michael Dante DiMartino, one of the series creators, in an interview with EW, noted that while the show's crew had always believed Kyoshi was bisexual, her feelings toward women and men were actually only explored in the young adult novel and in the comics branching off of the series.

On June 2, 2015, gay drag queen RuPaul guest starred as a snail in the episode "Costume Boxing!" of the series Bubble Guppies. He also guest starred as Jackie Slitherstein in the Harvey Beaks episode "Harvey's Favorite Book" which aired on July 18, 2015. The next year, Nickelodeon's Hey Arnold! was confirmed to have two gay characters. Eugene Horowitz and Mr. Robert Simmons were confirmed as gay in July 2016 by the show's creator show's creator Craig Bartlett, but not explicitly stated in the series.

On July 20, 2016, an interracial gay couple, Howard and Harold McBride, was introduced in an episode of The Loud House titled "Overnight Success." This couple was described by Michael Rubiner, executive producer of the show from 2018 to present, as only natural, Even so, the latter was censored by a South African broadcaster, DStv, despite the fact that it was met with "overwhelmingly positive reaction." They would be the first pair of married male characters to be depicted on a Nickelodeon series. In later years, Luna Loud would be revealed as a bisexual girl who sent a love letter to a girl named Sam Sharp in the June 2017 episode "L is for Love". She is also revealed to have a crush on a boy named Hugh. Later on, Sam seems to feel similarly about Luna and appears to reciprocate Luna's feelings in that episode and others, with Lori describing them as beginning to date in the episode "Racing Hearts," though neither character calls their excursion a date throughout the episode. Apart from this, in August 2019, the voice actor for Dana Dufresne, Maddie Taylor, revealed that the character had transitioned from a man to a trans woman, like herself, and said that the character would return in another episode within season 4. However, Season 4 concluded on July 23, 2020, although Dana would later reappear in the Season 6 episode "Prize Fighter". Additionally, the show featured two lesbian characters. In a February 2020 episode, Lainey, one of Lynn's roller derby team, is dating a girl named Alice. In 2021, GLAAD noted that the Loud House features Luna Loud, a possibly bisexual character, and Sam, her girlfriend, along with Howard and Harold McBride, "the two Dads of the protagonist’s best friend Clyde."

In October 2017 it was reported that a kiss between two female characters, Zarya Moonwolf and Kitty Boon, on the Nickelodeon show, Mysticons, was in danger of being cut. Despite this, the show showed the "development of a female-female romance," between Zarya, a main character, and her childhood friend, Kitty, known as "MoonBoon," culminating in romantic moments. In August 2018, the show's creator, Sean Jara, confirmed the two as a couple, noting that only one version of the episode was created and that the show's creative team fought for a kiss, but lost even though they managed "to keep the integrity of the love story." In later tweets, Jara said there is a "beautiful love story" between Zarya and Kitty in the show, referring to the interactions between the two characters in episode 37 ("The Princess and the Pirate"), stated the importance of showing "love between LGBTQ characters on TV," and said that the kiss was cut from the episode because of "systemic homophobia" in the kids television industry, crediting Rebecca Sugar for making strides. He then opined on the continual battle for more LGBTQ representation, cited an Entertainment Weekly article about LGBTQ representation in cartoons, and praised the battles for more representation which go on behind the scenes. He said this saying that Nick did not pick up the show for more than 40 episodes and, once again, confirmed Kitty and Zarya as a lesbian couple. Later, in September, Jara said that they treated the Kitty and Zarya relationship "like all the other relationships in the show." He added that while he was nervous and aware of possible roadblocks, Matt Ferguson, the show's director, supported it, as did his writing team, with Ferguson adding that pushback came from not from people who were "evil" but rather from those who were "trying to do the best job at their particular job."

Abbey White of Insider reported that when the show's studio changed the series to center on four teenage girls, Jara brought in more women and queer writers to the show's writing team, who were "responsible for building out an arc between lesbian characters Zarya Moonwolf and Kitty Boon," which fans gave the shipping name of "MoonBoon." Jara recalled that he sent in the script for a kiss of the two characters to the show's studios, and Nickelodeon, and fellow producers working on the show, but the moment never aired, despite support from Nickeledon, because a partner was concerned that the storyline was not "age-appropriate" for young viewers. As a result, despite Jara's attempts to convince the partner, the creative team had to scrap the kiss, and almost had to unravel the whole love story between Zarya and Kitty, but Jara fought for that to be included. In the article, Nelvana confirmed in a statement that the decision to remove the kiss was made during production of the show's Season Two, and said that they are committed to having "creative storytelling with diversity and inclusion at the forefront" when it comes to BIPOC and LGBTQ representation.

In 2019, Nickelodeon released Rocko's Modern Life: Static Cling, a television film and sequel to their 1993 series Rocko's Modern Life through Netflix. The producers worked with GLAAD to ensure that the transgender character, in the form of cartoonist frog Rachel Bighead (known as Ralph Bighead in the original series) as well as a plotline involving her coming out to her parents, Ed and Bev Bighead, was respectful to the LGBTQ+ community and fit within the show itself. The same year, in September, animated miniseries Middle School Moguls began airing on the channel. One of the characters was a non-binary fashion mogul named Wren. Also, one character, Yuna, in the main cast, had two moms, who appeared in two episodes as secondary characters who give Yuna moral support, giving her the inspiration to finish her fashion designs.

In 2020, Nickelodeon debuted a new television show, Danger Force. The episode Say My Name portrayed two dads of a lost child in which Danger Force was trying to find his parents. The same show also featured all four members (two males, two females) having a crush on male heartthrob, Creston. On June 13, 2020, Nickelodeon promoted LGBTQ+ characters in their shows, highlighting SpongeBob SquarePants and The Legend of Korra. While some said this "proved" that SpongeBob was gay, Stephen Hillenburg, back in 2005, said he considered SpongeBob to be asexual, with one writer for Out writing "it's important to realize that those who are asexual are queer as well and are just as welcome to dawn rainbows and celebrate Pride this month." It's Pony introduced Heston's aunt Meg and her girlfriend Marti.

In February 2021, Nickelodeon posted an online-exclusive video on the Blue's Clues & You! YouTube channel featuring an alphabet song in which the letter "P" stood for "P is full of Pride!" and featured multiple Pride flags. In May and, the same channel posted Pride Parade-themed songs that were performed by Drag Queen Nina West.
Betty Deville, mother of Phil and Lil DeVille, appears in the Rugrats reboot series, which began in May 2021. In the original series, she was married to a man Howard DeVille. In the reboot, Betty is a gay single mother. Betty is voiced by queer actress Natalie Morales. Morales described the character as a "single mom with her own business who has twins" but still hangs out with her community and friends, even casually talking about her ex-girlfriend. In the first episode "Second Time Around", Angelica sets Grandpa Lou up with dates on a seniors-only dating app called Silver Beagles. One of the dates is a man named Graham who is charmed by Lou. Graham becomes a recurring character in later episodes and is revealed to be bisexual. The second season will introduce Betty's girlfriend Trish. Trish will be voiced by bisexual actress Alia Shawkat.

In June 2021, Kevin Sullivan, a story editor for The Loud House told Insider that no one stopped him from using the word "lesbian" as part of a storyline involving Luna and Sam, her crush, and that he was proud of the whole episode. Sullivan added that the fact Luna wasn't more directly identified as a lesbian was not due to pressure from Nickelodeon and that he is glad the team didn't push it further because Luna then becomes "representative of so many more young people struggling with their identity." The Danger Force episode Manlee Man features a transgender boy Quinn played by real-life transgender actor Sasha Cohen. The episode was nominated for a GLAAD Media Award.

In September 2021, Izzy Garcia, the Green Ranger from Power Rangers Dino Fury was revealed to be a lesbian in the episode "The Matchmaker". She is the second LGBTQ Power Ranger in the franchise as Trini was portrayed as a lesbian in the 2017 Power Rangers film. The series won a GLAAD Award for Outstanding Kids and Family Programming. In 2023, the series was nominated again for Outstanding Kids and Family Programming.

In December 2021, The Casagrandes season 3 episode "Throwing Pains" revealed Ronnie Anne's classmate Becky to be a lesbian as she is in a relationship with a girl named Dodge.

In February 2022, the Big Nate episode "The Pimple" featured substitute teacher Donna. She is revealed to be a lesbian when Donna introduced her wife Kathleen to Dee Dee. Dee Dee herself would later fall in love with a girl named Amy in the episode "Six-Tween Candles" which was released in December 2022. The series is nominated for a GLAAD award for Outstanding Kids & Family Programming - Animated. Also in February, the Baby Shark's Big Show! episode "The Great Skate Case" introduced Vola's moms Viv and Vera. They also later appeared in the Mother's Day episode "Operation Happy Mommies". Viv is voiced by bisexual comedian and actress Sherry Cola.

In July 2022, The Loud House episode "Food Courting" confirmed Leni's friend Miguel to be gay when he had a crush on a guy named Gavin. Miguel is voiced by gay actor Tonatiuh Elizarraraz.

Monster High (2022) features a non-binary Frankie Stein and Deuce Gorgon's mothers Medusa and Lyra. Frankie Stein is voiced by non-binary actor Iris Menas. Frankie Stein is also portrayed as non-binary in Monster High: The Movie. The movie is being nominated for a GLAAD Award for Outstanding Kids & Family Programming - Live Action.

Star Trek: Prodigy features Zero, a genderless alien who prefers they/them pronouns.

In November 2022, the Transformers: EarthSpark two-part midseason finale "Age of Evolution" introduce Nightshade, one of the three new Terrans. Nightshade uses they/them pronouns. Nightshade is voiced by non-binary actor Z Infante. In another two-part episode "Home", Nightshade meets Sam, a non-binary human who goes by she/they pronouns.

LGBT representation on PBS
In 2005, PBS planned to release an episode of the children's series Postcards from Buster, titled "Sugartime", in which the animated bunny, Buster Baxter, visits the children of two lesbian mothers. When education secretary Margaret Spellings stated disapproval of the planned episode, PBS withdrew plans for airing. Spellings believed the episode to be inappropriate for children as well as a misuse of governmental funding that the show had received. Lisa Reilly (WGBH Member Services), stands by the episode stating that, "We believe, as do WGBH's educational advisers on this series, that the program is appropriate for our audience and fits the series' mission to introduce children to the rich and varied cultures that make up the United States, including kids living in a wide range of family structures." Apart from Reilly's statement, then-PBS chief operating officer Wayne Godwin said the episode brought up an issue that was "best left for parents and children to address together at a time and manner of their own choosing", while spokesperson Lea Sloan said it was "sensitive in today’s political climate." Godwin also claimed that the episode conflicted with PBS's purpose. This rationale was criticized by FAIR for violating the "terms of its Education Department grant", calling what PBS did an act of "political pandering," and asking people to contact PBS, calling on them to "support programming according to their mandate, not political pressures." Years later, Rebecca Sugar described Spellings' idea as "absurd," saying she recognized the challenges of creating LGBTQ+-friendly animation when she tried to enter the animation field.

Years later, the episode "Sugartime" was described as "one of the earliest LGBTQ representation moments in kids' TV," airing on only a few stations. The executive producer of Postcards from Buster and Arthur, Carol Greenwald, said they wanted to "showcase how there are so many different kinds of kids." Greenwald said the pulling of the episode was due to Spelling trying to "prove her conservative credentials." At the time, the episode was one of the earliest confirmed representations of LGBTQ people "in US animated children's TV," apart from characters in Superman: The Animated Series and Gargoyles.

It wasn't until 2019 when PBS aired an Arthur episode titled "Mr. Ratburn and the Special Someone", the Season 22 premiere, which featured Mr. Ratburn and Patrick marrying each other. He and his husband are the only LGBT characters in the series. Later, the episode was banned by some Alabama broadcasters. The episode was nominated for a GLAAD Media Award.

In 2020, an episode of Clifford the Big Red Dog aired on Amazon Prime Video and PBS Kids, titled "Dogbot". It featured Dr. and Rayla Mulberry, the two moms of Samantha Mulberry. Dr. Mulberry is voiced by Maggie Cassella, a lesbian actress. The episode was nominated for a GLAAD Media Award.

In 2023, the series Work It Out Wombats! aired on PBS Kids. The series features Duffy and Leiko, the moms of Louisa.

LGBT representation on Cartoon Network

In the 2010s, Cartoon Network became one of the key places for shows with LGBTQ characters and storylines. Some reviewers argued that when Disney and Cartoon Network are compared, its "easy to see who actually cares about LGBT representation," noting that for shows on Cartoon Network, "LGBT characters aren't centered around their sexuality." Others noted that the network hosted shows which were "strong champions for LGBT representation," like Adventure Time and Steven Universe. However, the creator of Steven Universe, Rebecca Sugar was told point-blank by executives that queer romance could have ended their show. In 2020, Cartoon Network aired the final episodes of the Steven Universe epilogue miniseries Steven Universe Future.

LGBT representation on Disney Channel

Disney series have often featured LGBTQ characters in its programming, since the founding of the Disney Channel, although these depictions have often been limited or characters have been secondary, rather than primary, characters, like Sheriff Blubs and Deputy Durland in Gravity Falls, a bisexual character named Jackie Lynn Thomas in Star vs. the Forces of Evil, and a lesbian (and interracial) married couple in Doc McStuffins. Additionally, Orka and Flix are gay couple in Star Wars Resistance, Big City Greens had a gay couple, DuckTales, featured two dads of Violet Sabrewing, and Amphibia introduced the same-sex couple, to name a few characters. The reboot The Proud Family: Louder and Prouder features an interracial gay couple and a character who is confirmed to be gender non-conforming and gay.

The Owl House, on the other hand, during its series run, dropped subtext and hints that several characters, like Luz Noceda and Amity Blight, within the show are LGBTQ+. The episode "Eda's Requiem" features a character named Raine Whispers, who goes by they/them pronouns and is voiced by transgender and non-binary actor Avi Roque. In March 2022, Lilith, Eda's older sister was confirmed to be aromantic asexual.

In 2017, Disney Channel in the United Kingdom aired a coming out scene on The Lodge, where Josh (Joshua Sinclair-Evans) explains to another character that girls are "not his type". The scene was the first coming out scene to be aired on a Disney Channel series. Also in 2017, Disney the creators of Andi Mack had the character Cyrus Goodman played by Joshua Rush come out as gay in the episode titled "Hey, Who Wants Pizza?" which was the first episode of season 2. In an effort to ensure the story arc was age appropriate for the network's young audience, Disney consulted with groups such as PFLAG, GLAAD, Common Sense Media, and The National Campaign to Prevent Teen and Unplanned Pregnancy. In a 2019 episode titled "One and a Minyan", Cyrus became the first Disney character ever to say the word "gay" in its modern meaning when coming out to his male best friend, Jonah Beck (portrayed by Asher Angel). In the episode's finale, Cyrus held hands with the character TJ Kippen, and the two were confirmed to be a couple by various members of the cast and crew. These were not the channel's first depiction of LGBT characters as Good Luck Charlie debuted the channel's first lesbian couple on January 26, 2014. While many celebrities tweeted their support (including former Disney star Miley Cyrus), conservative watch group One Million Moms was not quiet about their disapproval of the episode and launched an email campaign against the network. They were joined in support by other conservative groups such as Family Research Council.

LGBT representation on Amazon Video
In 2017, Amazon Video premiered the animated video series Danger & Eggs, for what would become its only season. Even so, it would break barriers with the amount of representation. The show, co-created by a trans woman named Shadi Petosky, was filled with LGBTQ+ characters: a femme "brown-skinned energetic creative" named Reina, a genderqueer character named Milo, who uses they/them pronouns Furthermore, the voice of Milo, an agender model named Tyler Ford said their character is an "accurate representation" of them. The show's final episode introduced the dads of Corporate Raider Jim, and a new trans teen, Zadie, who sings about acceptance and helps the series protagonists understand the meaning of a chosen family. By February 2018, the future of Danger and Eggs was uncertain. As Petosky put it at the time, she felt that the show was in limbo, with the loss of the crew, without "much concern or enthusiasm" about the show, saying it "just slipped through the cracks." She lamented that the show's fate is up the new executive team on the show and predicted the show would probably be cancelled as a result. In June 2021, the Mayor, a recurring character in the series, was confirmed as a trans woman.

In May 2021, in response to a fan, Petosky noted that the show had "4 trans women and 2 nonbinary voice actors who did 19 characters," specifically pointing to non-binary actors like River Butcher and Tyler Ford, and trans women such as herself, Angelica Ross, Jazz Jennings, and Molly Ritchie. In June 2021, Petosky, described as the "first known transgender showrunner in animation," described to Insider the challenges in producing her show, which follows a "young masc lesbian," D.D. Danger, said that she felt emboldened when Amazon picked up the show even with fears on whether a "trans person would even be allowed to run a show," with posters of Transparent in the corporate workplace. She noted that it the overt "queer themes and elements of LGBTQ culture," driven by a queer crew and cast, was a hard-fought battle with "little arguments, and battles, and suspensions" as the show was in production. For instance, she was told to use the term "Rainbow Parade" rather than use the word "Pride."

Another Amazon Video series Pete the Cat, premiered in 2017 with a New Years' special. The character Sally Squirrel has two fathers Syd and Sam, both voiced by gay actors Jim Parsons and Jesse Tyler Ferguson respectively.

In 2019, Amazon Video premiered The Bug Diaries which centers on three young bugs writing diaries. Worm has two mothers Mama Worm and Moma Worm. Mama Worm is voiced by lesbian comedian Wanda Sykes.

LGBT representation on CBBC
In November 1994, Byker Grove featured the first gay kiss on UK children's television. It broached the subject of "coming out" when Noddy Fishwick kissed his close friend Gary Hendrix at the back of a cinema. This scene caused outrage in the British tabloids and calls for producer Matthew Robinson to be sacked. However the BBC strongly backed the storyline, which received countrywide support from gay teenagers, many teachers, and parents. The 2004 series saw the character of Bradley agonising over his sexuality and eventually coming out as gay to his girlfriend Sadie, after a romantic holiday together had failed to live up to their expectations.

On 5 January 2013, The Dumping Ground aired an episode that centered around a child, Gus Carmichael (Noah Marullo), being adopted by a same-sex couple. In the episode, it was debated whether or not the couple should be allowed to foster Gus. After the debate, the same-sex couple were able to adopt Gus.

In 2013, creator of The Sarah Jane Adventures, Russell T. Davies, expressed his desire to implement a coming out scene for Luke Smith (Tommy Knight) if the series had continued past the fifth series. A boyfriend for the character, Sanjay, was written but never seen in the series. The idea was suggested by the CBBC network itself, but due to the death of cast member Elisabeth Sladen, the series ended prematurely.

In 2015, the CBeebies series Hey Duggee introduced Mr. John Crab and Nigel Crab who are a same sex couple.

In June 2020, Jamie Johnson character Dillon Simmonds (Patrick Ward) came out as gay, having previously been displayed as heterosexual. The storyline was highlighted for being introduced during pride month. On the storyline, CBBC stated: "Coming out isn't always easy, but by being a supportive ally we can hopefully create a safe space for the people we care about to be themselves".

In July 2020, CBBC aired an episode of The Next Step featuring two teenage girls kissing. Prior to the scene, characters Cleo (Dani Verayo) and Jude (Molly Saunders) were written to confess their feelings for each other, and begin a relationship together. The scene made history as the first same-sex kiss to be aired on the channel. Amidst both praise and criticism, the BBC defend the scene by stating: "CBBC is proud to reflect all areas of children's lives, including age appropriate representation of same sex relationships". The moment generated over 100 complaints, to which the BBC defended it, saying: "We believe that the storyline, and the kiss, was handled with sensitivity and without sensationalism, following as it did the portrayal of Jude and Cleo's developing relationship and I am afraid we do not agree that it was inappropriate for the audience age".

In August 2020, CBBC transmitted an episode of Mystic where character Caleb Burford (Joshua Tan) comes out as gay to Issie Brown (Macey Chipping). The scene was described as "groundbreaking" by Digital Spy.

LGBT representation on Discovery Family

My Little Pony: Friendship is Magic on Discovery Family had a range of representation as well. It included two characters, Lyra Heartstrings and Sweetie Drops, who propose to one another in the season 9 episode "The Big Mac Question," and in the series finale, "The Last Problem," they are shown as married in a newspaper clipping.

Also, King Sombra was confirmed by series writers Michael Vogel and Josh Haber to be bisexual while Aunt Holiday and Auntie Lofty are aunts to the young pegasus Scootaloo and are her guardians while Scootaloo's parents are away. The pair were identified as a lesbian couple by one of the show runners, Michael Vogel. According to Vogel, he and writers Nicole Dubac and Josh Haber agreed to establish the two in their first appearance in the book as a lesbian couple, though without explicitly stating as such, so that they could establish this within the show itself. Vogel stated they felt they could show that what elements make up a family is only determined by love, and not traditional roles.

The epilogue of the final episode hints that Rainbow Dash and Applejack are a domestic couple. Animation writer John Haber, producer Michael Vogel, and storyboarder Jim Miller said that it is up to fans to interpret whether they are in a relationship, but hinted at it as a possibility.

The official European Spanish My Little Pony Facebook page referred to Big McIntosh as Cheerilee's querido in May 2013, and in March 2016 Lauren Faust confirmed that one character in season 1 of My Little Pony was trans, but never specified which character she was talking about. Years later, in May 2019, storyboarder, and show director of My Little Pony: Equestria Girls, Katrina Hadley, expressed her support for "Appledash". A few months later, a storyboarder and co-director of the original My Little Pony series, Jim Miller, confirmed that Marble Pie found a special "somepony" for herself.

In September 2019, My Little Pony: Equestria Girls began showing on YouTube. The show featured Sunset Shimmer, who has an ex-boyfriend, Flash Sentry, and crushes on Twilight "Sci-Twi" Sparkle in the human world. Katrina Hadley, storyboarder, assistant director on My Little Pony Equestria Girls: Legend of Everfree and co-director of Equestria Girls specials, said it was "pretty obvious" Shimmer was bisexual. Apart from Shimmer, Rarity and Applejack were said to be on the edge of becoming a couple. Hadley described their conflict as a "little like a lovers quarrel" and that internally the staff were shipping both characters, opening the door for a romantic reading of both characters.

LGBT representation on Netflix

Netflix has contributed substantially to LGBT representation in animation throughout the 2010s and 2020s. GLAAD described Netflix as a company taking "impressive strides in viewership and impact," when it came to LGBTQ representation. Examples of original Netflix animated series with a large presence of LGBTQ characters include Kipo and the Age of Wonderbeasts and She-Ra and the Princesses of Power. In January 2021, GLAAD specifically highlighted the She-Ra and the Princesses of Power series finale which confirmed "its lead two characters, Catra and Adora, were queer and in love," and Kipo and the Age of Wonderbeasts which starred Benson, a gay character, and his love interest, Troy.

LGBT representation on Hulu
The Bravest Knight was released in June 2019. The series centers on Sir Cedric, his husband Prince Andrew (voiced by gay actors TR Knight and Wilson Cruz), and their daughter Nia. The series won a GLAAD award tied with High School Musical: The Musical: The Series.

In June 2021, the Madagascar: A Little Wild episode "Whatever Floats Your Float" featured an Okapi named Odee Elliot who is non-binary. Odee Elliot is voiced by Iris Menas The episode was nominated for a GLAAD Award for Outstanding Children's Programming.

In November 2021, a segment of Animaniacs titled "Know Your Scroll" featured a scene of two men dating. Pinky, a soap opera parody in the Pinky and the Brain segment "Mouse Madness" features a love affair between two men who are both named Pinky.

In December 2021, DreamWorks Dragons: The Nine Realms premiered on Hulu. The series introduced Alexandra Gonzalez's mothers Hazel and Carla Gonzalez.

LGBT representation on Apple TV+
In April 2020, an episode of Helpsters titled "Nurse Nina & Farmer Flynn" was released on Apple TV+. The episode featured a same-sex wedding between the titular characters. Nurse Nina returned in a season three episode of the same name.

In April 2022, Pinecone & Pony introduced a queer couple Gladys and Wren. Wren is also non-binary and prefers they/them pronouns. Wren is voiced by non-binary actor Ser Anzoategui. The series is 
being nominated for a GLAAD award for Outstanding Children's Programming. In the season 2 episode "A Life of Adventure", Gladys visits an old friend in order to honor her friend's sister Juli. Juli was also Gladys' wife who died before the events of the series. It is also noted that she lived a full life.

In May 2022, the Peanuts Mother's Day special Snoopy Presents: To Mom (and Dad), With Love was released on Apple TV+. The special features a reference to same-sex couples due to the line "some families have two moms". The line received homophobic backlash from Conservative Christians as the Peanuts franchise has a long-standing relationship with the religion.

LGBT representation on HBO Max
In June 2021, Sesame Street introduced a gay couple Dave, Nina's brother, and his husband Frank in season 51. They have a daughter named Mia. The episode "Family Day" won a GLAAD award for Outstanding Children's Programming. They returned in the season 53 episode "Family Picnic" which is being nominated for a GLAAD award for Outstanding Children's Programming.

In July 2021, Jellystone! premiered on HBO Max. The series features Jonny Quest and Hadji Singh who are portrayed as a gay married couple rather than adoptive brothers. The season 2 episode "The Sea Monster of Jellystone Cove" takes a look at their relationship. In the same thread, Iza confirmed Snagglepuss to be gay in this series. It also features Mildew Wolf who is also depicted as gay due to his flirting with Shazzan in the episode "Grocery Store." In another thread, Iza confirmed four of the characters (Jabberjaw, Squiddly Diddly, Bobbie Louie and Loopy De Loop) are transgender women.

In September 2021, Little Ellen premiered on HBO Max. The series is loosely based on Ellen DeGeneres' childhood. DeGeneres is a lesbian in real life. It also features Tallulah, a bakery owner. In the season 2 finale "Tallulah Ties the Knot", Tallulah marries her girlfriend Nini (voiced by Margaret Cho). Several same-sex couples are shown in the background.

LGBT representation on Peacock
In November 2020, Cleopatra in Space introduced Akila's mothers Theoda and Pothina.

In January 2022, Supernatural Academy premiered on Peacock and ran for one season. The series featured Jae, a non-binary faerie student who prefers they/them pronouns. Jae is voiced by transgender and non-binary actor Ali J. Eisner.

In independent children's media
In September 2007, Dottie's Magic Pockets became the first available show for children in gay and lesbian families.

In international children's media
"Rodney Guy", a segment on the Japanese children's series , which ran from 1992 to 1994, features same-sex marriages between Wonder Gal and Officer Gal, and Sport Guy and Handy Guy in one sketch. When Sailor Moon was released in the United States, elements of the story were removed because Optimum Productions, the Canadian company in charge of the English language product, claimed that some of the content “is not suitable for children.” 

Nelvana licensed Cardcaptor Sakura in North America, dubbed the series into English with Ocean Studios featuring Carly McKillip as Sakura, and released it under the name Cardcaptors. This version was heavily edited from the original Japanese version, and Nelvana spent roughly $100,000 on each episode to incorporate new music, scripts, and vocal tracks. The initial version of the dub covered all 70 episodes, although character names were changed, some Japanese text was changed to English, and subjects considered controversial at the time, such as same-sex relationships, were edited out. One of the censored themes was that of homosexual characters, including Tomoyo, who was changed from having a crush to being just a friend, and the gay relationship between Toya and Yukito, which was also portrayed as just friends.

In 2011, the Spanish-Dutch animated series Ask Lara featured two LGBT-themed episodes. The episode "My Martin" was about Monica realizing that her crush Martin is gay. Akira also mentions having an older sister who is a lesbian. The following episode "Balance" had Lara becoming friends with a lesbian girl named Jacquie.

In 2018, John Hart of Gays with Kids, wrote about how 16 Hudson, which aired on TVOKids beginning in 2018, featured episodes with a character who had two dads.

In 2022, The Fabulous Show with Fay and Fluffy is a cabaret-style series aimed at preschoolers. The series features drag duo Flay Slift and Fluffy Soufflé. It premiered on Family Jr. on February 20, 2022. In that same year, the Peppa Pig series 7 episode "Families", confirmed Penny Polar Bear has two moms Mummy Polar Bear and Dr Polar Bear.

See also

 Netflix and LGBT representation in animation
 Media portrayal of LGBT people
 LGBT themes in anime and manga

References

Citations

Sources
 
 
 

LGBT portrayals in mass media
Children's television